Jeffery Bernard Simmons Jr. (born July 28, 1997) is an American football defensive tackle for the Tennessee Titans of the National Football League (NFL). He played college football at Mississippi State and was drafted by the Titans with the 19th pick in the 2019 NFL Draft.

College career
After a standout career playing at Noxubee County High School in Mississippi, Simmons was considered a five-star prospect and committed to Mississippi State over Alabama and Ole Miss.

Simmons played in 12 games, starting three, as a true freshman in 2016. He had a breakout season in 2017 and was a consensus selection to the 2017 All-SEC football team.  On December 20, 2018, Simmons declared for the 2019 NFL Draft. On February 12, 2019, Simmons tore his ACL while training for the draft.

College statistics

Professional career

Simmons was drafted by the Tennessee Titans with the 19th pick in the 2019 NFL Draft.

2019 season: Rookie year

On May 22, 2019, Simmons signed a four-year $12.66 million rookie contract with a team option for a fifth year with a $7.23 million signing bonus. He was placed on the reserve/non-football injury list to start the 2019 season while recovering from his torn ACL.

On October 19, 2019, the Titans activated Simmons from the non-football injury list. He made his NFL debut the next day against the Los Angeles Chargers. In the game, Simmons recorded 4 tackles and sacked Philip Rivers once in the 23–20 win. The Titans finished with a 9–7 record, qualifying for the playoffs, with Simmons starting all seven games from weeks 8 to 15, recording 32 tackles, two sacks, and one pass deflection.

In the playoffs, the Titans won upsets over the New England Patriots and the Baltimore Ravens before losing the AFC Championship game against eventual Super Bowl champions, Kansas City Chiefs, with Simmons playing in all three games. In the Divisional Round against the Ravens, Simmons recovered a fumble forced by teammate Jurrell Casey on Lamar Jackson during the 28–12 road victory.

2020 season

During Week 3 against the Minnesota Vikings, Simmons recorded his first sack of the season during the 31–30 road victory. Simmons was placed on the reserve/COVID-19 list by the team on October 3. He was activated on October 15. In Week 9 against the Chicago Bears, Simmons forced a fumble on running back David Montgomery that was recovered and returned by teammate Desmond King for a 63 yard touchdown during the 24–17 win. Simmons was named the AFC Defensive Player of the Week for his performance in Week 9.

2022 season
The Titans picked up the fifth-year option on Simmons' contract on April 27, 2022.

NFL career statistics

Personal life
In college, Simmons was a two-time member of the SEC Academic Honor Roll. Simmons' brother, Dylan Bradley, played football at Southern Miss and then spent time with the Minnesota Vikings while his uncle, Jason Hatcher, played 10 total seasons with the Dallas Cowboys and Washington Redskins. Away from football, Simmons enjoys fishing and spending time outdoors. He has a son named Jeffery Jr. and two sisters, Brooke and Ashley.

Controversy

Arrest for assault
In March 2016 during his senior year in high school, Simmons was arrested and pleaded no contest to assault after a video surfaced showing him repeatedly hitting a woman while she was on the ground during a fight with Simmons' sister and mother.

Spitting accusation
Following the 2019-2020 Divisional Playoff game between the Tennessee Titans and the Baltimore Ravens, Ravens' guard Marshal Yanda accused Simmons of spitting in his face during the game. This was the first and only time in Yanda's 13-year NFL career that he had publicly accused another player of anything.

The first time Simmons was asked about the event by a reporter during an interview before a practice the following week, Simmons did not directly deny the accusation.

References

External links
 Sports Reference (college)
Mississippi State Bulldogs bio

1997 births
Living people
Players of American football from Mississippi
People from Macon, Mississippi
American football defensive tackles
Mississippi State Bulldogs football players
Tennessee Titans players
Ed Block Courage Award recipients
American Conference Pro Bowl players